Anna Pretorius is a South African former international lawn bowler.

Pretorius won a gold medal in the Women's fours at the 1994 Commonwealth Games in Victoria with Colleen Grondein, Lorna Trigwell and Hester Bekker. It was the first time that South Africa had won a gold medal since 1958, following the return from their Anti-Apartheid Movement Commonwealth ban enforced in 1961.

Her daughter Linda Ralph won a New Zealand bowls national title after emigrating to that country.

References

Living people
South African female bowls players
Bowls players at the 1994 Commonwealth Games
Commonwealth Games gold medallists for South Africa
Commonwealth Games medallists in lawn bowls
Year of birth missing (living people)
Medallists at the 1994 Commonwealth Games